The Ethiopian oriole (Oriolus monacha) is a species of bird in the family Oriolidae.

It is found in north-eastern Africa where its natural habitat is subtropical or tropical dry forests.

Taxonomy and systematics
The Ethiopian oriole was originally described in the genus Turdus. Alternate names for the Ethiopian oriole include the Abyssinian black-headed oriole, Abyssinian oriole, black-headed forest oriole, dark-headed oriole, Ethiopian black-headed oriole, Ethiopian forest oriole and forest oriole.

Subspecies
Two subspecies are recognized: 
 Omo black-headed oriole (O. m. meneliki) - Blundell & Lovat, 1899: Originally described as a separate species. Found in southern Ethiopia
 O. m. monacha - (Gmelin, 1789): Found in northern Ethiopia, Eritrea

References

Ethiopian oriole
Ethiopian oriole
Birds of the Horn of Africa
Ethiopian oriole
Ethiopian oriole
Taxonomy articles created by Polbot